Maritima may refer to:

 912 Maritima, an asteroid
 Alba Maritima (titular see), a Catholic titular see
 Caesarea Maritima, a city and harbor built by Herod
 CD Orientación Marítima, a football team in Arrecife, Canary Islands
 Cupra Marittima, a town on the Adriatic coast
 Maritima Avaticorum, the ancient chief town of the Avatici
 Ora Maritima, the sea coasts, a poem 
 Secil Maritima, a flagship in Angolan shipping
 Beta vulgaris, subsp. maritima, see sea beet

See also
 Maritime (disambiguation)
 Maritimus (disambiguation)
 Maritimum (disambiguation)